Vatica rotata is a tree in the family Dipterocarpaceae, native to Borneo. The specific epithet rotata means "wheel-like", referring to the lobes of the fruit calyx.

Description
The inflorescences bear cream flowers.

Distribution and habitat
Vatica rotata is endemic to Borneo.

Conservation
Vatica rotata has been assessed as endangered on the IUCN Red List. It is threatened mainly by agricultural encroachment on the species' habitat.

References

rotata
Endemic flora of Borneo
Plants described in 1967